Henry Cowell wrote the piano piece The Snows of Fuji-Yama, HC 395, in 1924. 

The piece was from Cowell's tone cluster phase and was his first expedition into the foray of Asian-inspired music, using black-key clusters to emphasize a pentatonic scale in F major. He first performed the piece at a concert in the Los Angeles Millennium Biltmore Hotel on November 20, 1926.


See also
List of solo piano compositions by Henry Cowell

Notes

References

Citations

Sources
 Sachs, Joel (2012). Henry Cowell: A Man Made of Music. Oxford: Oxford University Press.

External links
 
 

20th-century classical music
1924 compositions
Compositions by Henry Cowell
Compositions for solo piano
Compositions that use extended techniques
Modernist compositions